Posey Range is a mountain range in eastern Bowers Mountains, bounded by the Smithson, Graveson, Lillie and Champness Glaciers. Mapped by United States Geological Survey (USGS) from ground surveys and U.S. Navy air photos, 1960–62. Named by Advisory Committee on Antarctic Names (US-ACAN) for Julian W. Posey, meteorologist, who was scientific leader at South Pole Station, winter party 1959.

Features
Geographical features include:

 Graveson Glacier
 Mount Draeger
 Mount Mulach
 Smithson Glacier

Further reading
 R. L. Oliver, P. R. James, J. B. Jago, Antarctic Earth Science, PP 119-120

External links
 
 
 

Mountain ranges of Victoria Land
Pennell Coast